Kribia is a genus of sleeper gobies from the family Butidae which are endemic to freshwater habitats in West and Middle Africa.

Species
The recognized species in this genus are:
 Kribia kribensis (Boulenger, 1907)
 Kribia leonensis (Boulenger, 1916)
 Kribia nana (Boulenger, 1901)
 Kribia uellensis (Boulenger, 1913)

References

Butidae